Salami is cured sausage, fermented and air-dried meat, originating from one of a variety of animals.

Salami may also refer to:

Places
 Salami, Iran, a city in Razavi Khorasan Province, Iran
 Salami, Ramhormoz, a village in Khuzestan Province, Iran
 Salami, Shadegan, a village in Khuzestan Province, Iran
 Salami District, Razavi Khorasan Province, Iran
 Salami Rural District (Khuzestan Province), Iran
 Salami Rural District (Razavi Khorasan Province), Iran
 Salami Plantation, see Admiralty Islands campaign

People
 Adebayo Salami, Nigerian politician 
 Adigun Salami (born 1988), Nigerian footballer
 Eugène Salami (born 1989), Nigerian footballer
 Gbolahan Salami (born 1991), Nigerian footballer
 Hossein Salami (born 1960), Iranian major general and commander-in-chief of the Islamic Revolutionary Guard Corps
 Khadija al-Salami (born 1966), Yemeni female film producer
 Minna Salami (born 1978), Finnish-Nigerian journalist
 Zul Kifl Salami, Beninese economist and politician

Other uses
 Slang for a grand slam homer in baseball

See also
Salaami, 1994 Indian film
 Salama (disambiguation)
 Salameh (disambiguation)
 Salamé disambiguation)
 Salamis (disambiguation)
 Salumi